Stoeberia is a genus of flowering plants belonging to the family Aizoaceae.

It is native to Namibia and also the Cape Provinces in the South African Republic.

The genus name of Stoeberia is in honour of Ernst Stoeber (1889–1927?), a German teacher and botanist in Lüderitz in present-day Namibia. 
It was first described and published in Z. Sukkulentenk. Vol.3 on page 17 in 1927.

Known species
According to Kew:
Stoeberia arborea 
Stoeberia beetzii 
Stoeberia carpii 
Stoeberia frutescens 
Stoeberia giftbergensis 
Stoeberia gigas 
Stoeberia utilis

References

Aizoaceae
Aizoaceae genera
Plants described in 1927
Flora of Namibia
Flora of the Cape Provinces
Taxa named by Kurt Dinter
Taxa named by Martin Heinrich Gustav Schwantes